Helmut Weiss (January 25, 1907 – January 13, 1969) was a German actor, screenwriter, and film director. He was notable for directing Tell the Truth the first film produced in what was to become the future West Germany after the Second World War. It was made in Hamburg in the British Zone of Occupation. Much of the film had already been made at the UFA studios in Berlin shortly before the arrival of the Red Army, but Weiss dramatically re-shot it. The film was significant in its use of outdoor locations in common with other post-war rubble films.

Selected filmography

Actor
 Trouble Backstairs (1935)
 Scandal at the Fledermaus (1936)
 Family Parade (1936)
 Nanon (1938)
 Kitty and the World Conference (1939)
 The Leghorn Hat (1939)
 The Girl from Fano (1941)
 The Gasman (1941)
 Rembrandt (1942)
 Love and Trumpets (1954)
 Oasis (1955)
 Fanny Hill (1964)

Screenwriter
 I Entrust My Wife to You (1943)
 Hello, Fraulein! (1949)
 Beloved Liar (1950)
 Street Serenade (1953)
 Santa Lucia (1956)
 Paradise for Sailors (1959)

Director
 Die Feuerzangenbowle (1944)
 Quax in Africa (not completed during the Reich; allied ban in 1945; shown in 1953)
 Tell the Truth (1946)
 King of Hearts (1947)
 Tromba (1949)
 Don't Dream, Annette (1949)
 The Disturbed Wedding Night (1950)
 My Friend the Thief (1951)
 Once on the Rhine (1952)
 Hubertus Castle (1954)
 Love and Trumpets (1954)
 The First Day of Spring (1956)
 Engagement at Wolfgangsee (1956)
 Lemke's Widow (1957)
 An American in Salzburg (1958)
 Every Day Isn't Sunday (1959)
  (1959)
 Three Men in a Boat (1961)

References

Bibliography

External links

1907 births
1969 deaths
German male film actors
Mass media people from Göttingen
20th-century German male actors